Norton City Schools is the school division of Norton, Virginia. Its schools are Norton Elementary and Middle School and John I. Burton High School. Pursuant to state law and the Norton City Charter, Norton City Schools is governed by the Norton City School Board and multiple state legislative and administrative departments. The current Superintendent of Norton City Schools is Gina Wohlford, and the Chairman of the Norton City School Board is Cody McElroy.

References

External links
 Norton City Schools

Norton, Virginia
School divisions in Virginia